Steve Soley (born 22 April 1971) is an English former footballer who played in the Football League, who was signed by Alan Ball. He played for Portsmouth, Macclesfield Town and Carlisle United.

Career
Soley began his professional career at the age of 24 after he was signed from non-league Leek Town by Portsmouth in 1998. He establish himself at Portsmouth, after being signed by Alan Ball. He had loan spells at Macclesfield Town and Carlisle United before joining the latter on a permanent basis. After spending three years at Carlisle, he left to join Southport. He also played semi professional rugby league after retiring.

References

External links

1971 births
Living people
Footballers from Widnes
Association football midfielders
English footballers
Leek Town F.C. players
Portsmouth F.C. players
Macclesfield Town F.C. players
Carlisle United F.C. players
Southport F.C. players
English Football League players